Wendell Ramone "Jay" Ellis Jr. (born December 27, 1981) is an American actor. In 2013, Ellis received his first major role on BET's series The Game. His role as Martin "Lawrence" Walker in the HBO series Insecure (2016-2021), earned him an NAACP Image Award for Outstanding Actor in a Comedy Series. He later starred in the horror film Escape Room (2019), and appeared in Top Gun: Maverick (2022).

Early life and education 
Wendell Ramone Ellis Jr. was born on December 27, 1981, in Sumter, South Carolina. His father worked for the Air Force, while his mother, Paula Bryant-Ellis, worked as a finance executive. He is the only child of the family. He went to 12 schools in 13 years, before attending Concordia University in Oregon, where he played basketball.

Career
Ellis worked as a public relations intern for the Portland Trail Blazers during their infamous "Jail Blazers" era. After completing his internship, Ellis switched his focus to modeling and started working with Portland-based sportswear companies such as Nike, Adidas and Columbia Sportswear.

Acting 
In 2004, Ellis moved to Los Angeles to focus on his acting career. He launched his career as a professional actor in 2005, when he appeared briefly in single episodes of the television series Invasion and Related. In 2011-2012, he made appearances on the series Grey's Anatomy, NCIS and How I Met Your Mother.

His first major acting role was in 2013, starring in BET's series The Game. In August 2015, it was announced that Ellis has joined the cast of HBO's comedy series Insecure, which premiered in October 2016. He plays the role of Lawrence Walker, who has a long-term relationship with main character Issa Dee played by Issa Rae. For his work on the show, Ellis received the Outstanding Supporting Actor in a Comedy Series award at the 49th NAACP Image Awards.

He starred as Reuben "Payback" Fitch in Top Gun: Maverick.

The Untold Story: Policing 
In 2020, Ellis started hosting The Untold Story: Policing, a four-part podcast series co-produced by Campaign Zero and Lemonada Media. Through interviews with academics, data scientists, and community organizers, the podcast demystifies police union contracts and investigates how they contribute to violent police misconduct across the United States. Ellis serves as the series’ host, as well as an executive producer alongside DeRay Mckesson, Stephanie Wittels Wachs, and Jessica Cordova Kramer.

Philanthropy 
In 2017, Ellis partnered with leading HIV/AIDS research organization, amfAR.

Personal life
Ellis has been in a relationship with Serbian model and actress Nina Seničar since 2015. Their daughter was born in November 2019. On July 9, 2022, they married in Italy.

Filmography

Film

Television

Producer

Awards and nominations

References

External links
 
 Jay Ellis on Instagram

1981 births
Living people
American male film actors
American male television actors
African-American male actors
21st-century American male actors
Concordia University (Oregon) alumni
Concordia Cavaliers men's basketball players
21st-century African-American people
20th-century African-American people